Steered-Response Power Phase Transform (SRP-PHAT) is a popular algorithm for acoustic source localization, well known for its robust performance in adverse acoustic environments. The algorithm can be interpreted as a beamforming-based approach that searches for the candidate position that maximizes the output of a steered delay-and-sum beamformer.

Algorithm

Steered-Response Power 

Consider a system of  microphones, where each microphone is denoted by a subindex . The (unweighted) steered-response power (SRP) at a spatial point  can be expressed as

The (weighted) SRP can be rewritten as 

where  is the sampling frequency of the system,  is the sound propagation speed,  is the position of the -th microphone,  is the 2-norm and  denotes the rounding operator.

Generalized Cross-Correlation 

The above SRP objective function can be expressed as a sum of Generalized Cross-Correlations (GCCs) for the different microphone pairs at the time-lag corresponding to their TDOA

where the GCC for a microphone pair  is defined as

The phase transform (PHAT) is an effective GCC weighting for time delay estimation in reverberant environments, that forces the GCC to consider only the phase information of the involved signals:

Estimation of source location 

The SRP-PHAT algorithm consists in a grid-search procedure that evaluates the objective function  on a grid of candidate source locations  to estimate the spatial location of the sound source, as the point of the grid that provides the maximum SRP:

Modified SRP-PHAT 

Modifications of the classical SRP-PHAT algorithm have been proposed to reduce the computational cost of the grid-search step of the algorithm and to increase the robustness of the method. In the classical SRP-PHAT, for each microphone pair and for each point of the grid, a unique integer TDOA value is selected to be the acoustic delay corresponding to that grid point. This procedure does not guarantee that all TDOAs are associated to points on the grid, nor that the spatial grid is consistent, since some of the points may not correspond to an intersection of hyperboloids. This issue becomes more problematic with coarse grids since, when the number of points is reduced, part of the TDOA information gets lost because most delays are not anymore associated to any point in the grid.

The modified SRP-PHAT collects and uses the TDOA information related to the volume surrounding each spatial point of the search grid by considering a modified objective function:

Accumulation limits 

The accumulation limits can be calculated beforehand in an exact way by exploring the boundaries separating the regions corresponding to the points of the grid. Alternatively, they can be selected by considering the spatial gradient of the TDOA , where each component  of the gradient is:

For a rectangular grid where neighboring points are separated a distance , the lower and upper accumulation limits are given by:

where  and the gradient direction angles are given by

See also 

 Acoustic source localization
 Multilateration
 Audio signal processing

References

Signal processing
Digital signal processing